The Volvo Open 70 (sometimes referred to as a Volvo Ocean 70) is the former class of racing yachts designed for the Volvo Ocean Race. It was first used in the 2005–06 race (replacing the Volvo Ocean 60 yachts which were first used in 1993).

According to the VO70 rule, the yachts can be made from glass fibres, aramid fibres, or carbon fibres (which were not allowed for VO60s). It uses a canting keel which is capable of canting transversely up to an angle of 40 degrees.

The Volvo Open 70 is not a singular yacht design or boat but rather a set of design rules to which competing boats must adhere. This is similar to the concept to the design and construction rules that define a racing car. Competing teams design and build boats within the scope of this rule to try and come up with the fastest boat for the expected conditions of the race.

Version 2 of the VO70 rule which “has been further developed to apply the lessons learned on the last event and ensure the continuing evolution of this outstanding class” was released in September 2006.
 A revised VO70 rule, version 3, was released in 2011.

The boat proved expensive and fragile, with numerous structural failures during races. On June 28, 2012, during a stopover in Lorient, France during the 2011–2012 Volvo Ocean Race, it was announced the boat would be replaced by the Volvo Ocean 65 for future editions of the race .

Measurements

Records
In 2010 the VO70 Delta Lloyd (former ABN Amro I) established a new English Channel record with skipper Bouwe Bekking. In 2010 the VO70 Groupama 70 (former Ericsson 4) broke the record for the Round Britain and Ireland Race in 5 days 21:26:55. (This record was broken by the VO65 Abu Dhabi in the 2014 race with 4 days 13:10:28.) In July 2011 the VO70 Puma Mar Mostro won the TR 2011 on handicap, finishing second only to Rambler 100. At the 2011 Fastnet Race the three first monohulls were all VO70s and they all broke the existing monohull record. The record now stands at 1d 18hrs and 39 min set by VO70 Abu Dhabi.

WARRIOR owned by the US Merchant Marine Academy and Skippered by Stephen Murray, Jr. holds the monohull record for the Vineyard Race of 17 hours, 42 minutes and 9 seconds set in 2017.

Past records
A VO70 first broke the world monohull speed record in 2005, with other V70s resetting the record in subsequent years, such that the VO70s held the record for 10 consecutive years.

In April 2005, the VO70 Movistar broke the 24 hour world monohull speed record when she sailed 530 nautical miles. In 2006 ABN Amro II broke that record when she sailed 562.96 nautical miles. This record was broken in October 2008 by Ericsson 4 with 596.6 nm Ericsson 4 skipper Torben Grael and his crew made the record on the first leg of the 2008–2009 Volvo Ocean Race, when a strong cold front hit the fleet, bringing winds approaching 40 knots, and propelling the yacht at an average speed of 24.8 knots.

This record stood for 7 years until the supermaxi Comanche, a boat 30 feet longer than the VO70s, established a new record of 618.01 nautical miles on July 10–11 2015 in the Transatlantic Race.

Pictures

References

External links 
Volvo Ocean Race – About the Race; The Boats
Volvo Ocean Race – About the Race; Volvo Open 70 Rule
Volvo Ocean Race Yacht Designs, by François Chevalier
 11 April 2012, Juan Kouyoumdjian statement on the breakages in the Volvo Ocean Race

Sailing yachts

Development sailing classes
Box rule sailing classes